Olepa neumuthi is a species of moth the family Erebidae. It is endemic to the Indochinese region and was discovered in 2011 by the German entomologist Hans Helmuth Neumuth (1942-2013) and classified by the French entomologist Georges E.R.J. Orhant.

The larvae only feed on Ricinus communis, which is curious because this plants produces the natural insecticide ricin.

References 

Arctiinae
Moths described in 2012